The Chunsa Film Art Awards ( also known as The 27th Chunsa International Film Festival) have been hosted by the Korean Film Directors Association, since the 1990s to commemorate the Korean film pioneer Chunsa Na Woon-gyu. Previously known as Chunsa Film Festival, it became an international film festival last year.

Themed as 'Move Again', The 27th Chunsa International Film Festival was held on September 30. In this edition, nominees from films released from July 1, 2021 to July 31, 2022 were selected for the main awards in 10 categories. In the ceremony hosted by Kim Ye-eun and Ji Eun-ho, Park Chan-wook won the best direction award for Decision to Leave.

Judges
Source:

 Koo Hye-sun: South Korean actress, singer-songwriter, director and artist.
 Yoo Young-sik: South Korean film director, film critic, film producer, and university professor.
 Park Jong-won: South Korean film director and screenwriter
 Shin Seung-soo: South Korean writer and director
 Jo Jom-hwan

Winners and nominees 
The nominees for the 27th Chunsa Film Art Awards were announced on August 26, 2022.

Films with multiple nominations
The following films received multiple nominations:

References

External links
 
 Chunsa Film Art Awards at Daum 

2022 film awards
South Korean film awards
Annual events in South Korea
2022 in South Korean cinema
Events in Seoul